Taiwan, officially the Republic of China, has 113 diplomatic missions across the world . Due to the One-China policy held by the People's Republic of China on the Chinese mainland, other states are only allowed to maintain relations with one of the two countries.  As most countries have changed their recognition to the latter over time, only 16 of Taiwan's diplomatic missions have official status, consisting of thirteen embassies and two consulate-generals. This makes Taiwan one of the few countries in the world that has resident embassies in all of the states with which it has formal diplomatic relations.

Despite these barriers, 59 United Nations members maintain relations with Taiwan on an unofficial basis. In addition, Taiwan has informal relations with Somaliland, a state that is not internationally recognized by any other country, including China. To serve these locations and other places throughout the world, 92 semi-official representative offices are utilized for matters that would otherwise be handled by embassies or consulates. Their heads are still appointed by the Ministry of Foreign Affairs, making them de facto missions.  Owing to pressure from the People's Republic, most of these offices cannot operate under either the country's official or common name, using the name of the capital Taipei instead to avoid addressing Taiwan's political status. This policy has shifted in recent years, with  the offices in  Somaliland (opened 2020) and Lithuania (2021) using "Taiwan" in their names. Taiwan also maintains permanent missions to the European Union and the World Trade Organization, with the latter under the name "Separate Customs Territory of Taiwan, Penghu, Kimmen and Matsu".

Taiwan has also established informal representation in China's two Special Administrative Regions. In Hong Kong, the Taipei Economic and Cultural Office in Hong Kong provides services similar to a consulate, while relations to Macau are handled by the Taipei Economic and Cultural Office in Macau. In addition, under a mechanism established in 2010, the Taiwanese government is directly represented in negotiations with its Hong Kong counterpart by the Taiwan–Hong Kong Economic and Cultural Co-operation Council (ECCC), with the latter operating a similar office in reciprocation. Taiwan also maintains unofficial diplomatic exchanges with China using the Straits Exchange Foundation, but the organization does not have a physical presence in the mainland as of 2020.

Diplomatic missions

Active

Multilateral organizations

Former

Gallery

See also 

 Foreign relations of Taiwan
 List of diplomatic missions in Taiwan

Explanatory notes

References

Citations

General bibliography

External links 

 Ministry of Foreign Affairs, Republic of China (Taiwan)
 Bureau of Consular Affairs
 Portal of Republic of China (Taiwan) diplomatic missions

 
Taiwan
Diplomatic missions